German vehicle registration plates ( or, more colloquially) are alphanumeric plates in a standardized format, issued officially by the district authorities to motorized vehicles of German residents. The legal requirements for these licence plates are laid down in a federal law titled  (Ordinance on the admission of vehicles for road traffic), or in the shortened version  which replaced part of an older law named  in 2011.

All motorized vehicles participating in road traffic on public space, whether moving or stationary, have to bear the plates allotted to them, displayed at the appropriate spaces at the front and rear. Additionally, the official seals on the plates show their validity which can also be proven by the documentation coming with them. Motorcycles and trailers carry only the rear plate. The system of number plates used on cars, buses, trucks, trailers and motorcycles is described below. Its most significant feature is the first part, an area code of one, two or three letters which used to tell the district of registration. It has developed into a widespread habit in Germany, even a children's game when travelling, to guess “where that vehicle is from”.

A different system applies to smaller vehicles such as mopeds, cf. insurance plates.

Format

German number plates are rectangular, with standard dimensions  for cars, trucks, buses and their trailers. Plates bearing few characters may have reduced length but must retain the size and shape of the characters. Plates in two lines for the said types of vehicles measure .

The characters on the licence plate, as well as the narrow rim framing it, are black on a white background. The smaller plates bear characters of  height and  width, respectively. In the current system, introduced in 1956, they consist of an area code of one, two or three letters, followed by an identifier sequence of one or two letters and one to four digits. The total quantity of characters on the plate must not exceed eight. Identifiers consisting of one letter with one- or two-digit numbers are often reserved for motorcycle use since there is less space for plates on these vehicles, especially before the reduction of plate size to 180 × 200 mm and 220 × 200 mm in 2011.

Typeface
Modern German plates use a typeface called  (tamper-hindering script). It is designed so that the letter P cannot be altered to look exactly like an R, and vice versa; nor can the F or the L be forged to equal an E, etc. Another feature is the equal width of all characters, different from the old DIN 1451 script which had been in use since the introduction of the current system, in 1956. FE-Schrift can be read by OCR software for automatic number plate recognition more easily than DIN 1451.

The present style was introduced in 1994 and became mandatory in 2000, so the number of licence plates issued in the old style has become very rare. As with many plates for countries within the European Union, a blue strip on the left shows a shortened country code in white text (D for  = Germany) and the Flag of Europe (12 golden stars forming a circle on a blue background).

Material
Traditionally, German licence plates are made of aluminium sheet, with embossed characters rising above background level. Over the years, however, various other materials have been used, albeit to a small extent only. Since 2013, a new style of plates made of plastic is allowed. They are said to be less sensitive to mechanical damage and to cause less CO2 emission in their production, but are more expensive.

Number plates are retroflective, but must not be mirroring, concealed or soiled, nor may they be covered by glass, foil or similar layers. Occasionally, drivers who adorn their licence plate with a badge of their favourite football club are fined and ordered to restore the original state.

Constituent elements

Area Code
The first part or  consists of one, two or three letters representing the district where the car was registered, such as B for Berlin or HSK for Hochsauerlandkreis. These letters formerly coincided with the German districts. They were assigned unambiguously, as each district had one abbreviation only. Whenever a district changed its name or was merged with another, the area code would be redefined and any vehicle registered henceforth could only be issued the current code. Since 2013, however, this rule was revoked and area codes long abolished were re-introduced. In consequence, many districts use more than one code, and certain codes, on the other hand, are not assigned to one district only.

In some cases an urban district and the surrounding non-urban district share the same letter code. Usually, these are distinguished by different letter/digit patterns. For example, the urban district of  has one letter after the area code (SR-A 123), whereas the surrounding district  has two letters (SR-AB 123) in this place.

Germany includes diacritical marks in the letters of some codes, that is the letters Ö and Ü; formerly also Ä. For a long time, German codes kept to the rule that a code with an umlaut would prohibit another code with the respective blank vowel, e.g. there could not be a district code FU as the code FÜ was already in use for Fürth. This rule was disregarded in 1996, when BÖ was introduced for Bördekreis in spite of BO existing for Bochum.

Development of the area code
When the area codes were introduced, they were intended mainly as a means for police officers to identify speeders and other traffic offenders. However, they soon developed into everyday abbreviations of people's home areas and were cherished or despised. Sometimes, the codes of neighbouring districts were given mocking or spiteful meanings. When districts merged and only one of their codes could be continued, fierce battles might ensue about which one.

The Büsingen exclave

Although Büsingen belongs to the German district of Konstanz, it is part of the Swiss customs area. For this reason, a vehicle registered to a citizen of Büsingen does not bear KN for Konstanz but BÜS, signifying to Swiss customs officers that this is in fact a domestic vehicle. There are about 700 cars with this area code, which makes Büsingen the smallest and least-populated registration precinct in Germany.

List of Area Codes

Stickers
Registration plates become valid with the official seal of registration. This is a sticker of  diameter, following the area code and bearing, in colours, the seal of the respective German  with the name of the state and the issuing district authority added in print. Older stickers were monochrome, black on silver or white, and smaller, depicting the seal of either the Bundesland or the city district.

The rear plate bears, above the official seal, the vehicle safety test sticker. This test is obligatory three years after the first registration, and every two years after that. The expiration date can be seen at one glance, as the sticker is attached with the month of expiration pointing upwards. The black marking, covering the sectors on either side of 12, thus makes it easy for the police to read the expiration month from a distance. Like the hand on a clock, the marking shows the position of a number on the face of a clock. The year when the next safety test is due is printed in the centre of the sticker and also indicated by the colour of the sticker which is repeated every six years.

Between 1985 and 2010, a similar yet hexagonal sticker was applied to the front plate, certifying the emission test. Since that year, the emission test was incorporated into the safety test and was not performed separately any more, so the emission sticker became obsolete.

All these stickers are specially treated to be easily transferred onto the licence plates, but hard to be removed without damaging the plate itself, making them relatively counterfeit-proof.
The only licence plates which do not need to carry either seal are repeaters. These are obligatory when the original rear plate is covered, in part or whole, by cargo or attached parts, such as bicycle carriers.

Serial letters and digits
Thus, basically any combination from A1 to ZZ9999 is possible, yet restricted by the maximum length of eight characters, including the area code. All 26 letters of the Latin alphabet may be used, yet this was not always so. In order to avoid confusion between B and 8, F and E, G and 6, I and 1, O and Q and 0, those six letters were excluded from the middle part of registration plates. In 1992, the letters B, F and G were permitted, and in 2000 the alphabet was completed as I, O and Q have been allowed. In the very first months of the numbering system, between July and November 1956, the letter I was used but J was not. This was soon reversed, but single vintage cars kept sporting their letter I between 1956 and 2000 when it was re-introduced.

In the style used until 1994, a hyphen following the area code was used to separate the two groups of letters. This does no longer appear in the new format but is often retained, as the space between the geographic identifier and serial letters is a significant character and must be considered when writing down or transmitting a number. For example, F ST 683 is different from FS T 683. The risk of confusion can be avoided by writing a hyphen after the city code, like F-ST 683. For this reason, the police will usually radio the location name and spell out the next letters, using the German telephone alphabet.

While the number is issued by each district authority separately, a probable split between two or more districts sharing the same area code has to be considered. Further restrictions are caused by “prohibited” combinations (see below).

Personalised plates

For an extra charge of €10.20, vehicle owners can register a personalised identifier, keeping to the above rules. In most cases of personalised plates, owners choose their initials and a number reflecting their date of birth. By combining area code and random letters, further possibilities arise, such as a man from Oldenburg named Olaf, born on Christmas Eve, could choose OL-AF 2412. A resident of the town of Pirna might choose PIR-AT 77,  meaning “pirate” in German.  is one of few places where the number plate can spell out all of the city name.

BMW itself is based in Munich, yet M-INI plates are not possible to issue, as three letters after the district code are not permitted.

From 1970s up to 1994, Essen city buses owned by city transport company EVAG (Essener Verkehrs-AG) were registered with E-AT number plates, essen means "to eat" in German.

These vanity plates can only be made up of the available prefixes and numbers, within the general rules. A James Bond fan from Hamburg would not be allowed the plate HH-JB 007 because leading digits 0 (or even double-0) are not possible; however, he might strive for HH-J 8007 or HH-OO 7, imitating digits by letters or vice versa. The owner of a Volkswagen Polo can certainly show VW in the middle section, but neither PO-LO 1995 nor VW-P0 L01 would be possible, as these prefixes are not issued nor may letters and digits be mixed at will. Nonetheless, a notable variety of personalised number plates can be spotted on German roads.

Prohibited combinations
This refers mostly to abbreviations relating to Nazi Germany, such as NS (National Socialism), KZ (concentration camp), HJ (Hitler Youth), SS (Schutzstaffel) and SA (Sturmabteilung). Therefore, these two-letter combinations are generally not issued in any district, nor do the city districts of Nuremberg, Cologne and Stuttgart issue one-letter plates which would result in the combinations N-S, K-Z, S-A, S-D and S-S.

Those prefixes which will not be issued as middle letters were also excluded from the list of possible area codes with the introduction of the current system, although between 1945 and 1949 the French occupation force had used the combination SA followed by the double-digit numbers 01 to 08 for the then seven rural districts in the Saar Protectorate and its capital . Nor were these codes later taken into consideration for newly formed districts in former GDR: The district  used the name of its capital, Pirna, in its code PIR, to avoid the use of SS. When the districts of Torgau, Delitzsch and Oschatz merged into , they combined their initials into TDO, instead of abbreviating Northern Saxony as NS.

In everyday German, the letters AH are not regarded as an obvious abbreviation for that name, even less so in the 1950s when the lists were created. Nonetheless, these two-letter codes and the respective numerals 18 and 88, signifying the first and eighth letter of the alphabet, obviously have developed into Nazi symbols. They are therefore generally avoided in the serial part of licence plates, although they may be found sometimes. Generally, the decision whether or not a certain combination is permitted lies with the respective district authority. In Brandenburg, any plates that are related to Hitler, the Hitler salute, etc. cannot be issued, especially if they would be bearing digits 1888, 8818, 8888 or ending in 88, 888, 188. Nor can the combinations AH 18 and HH 18 be issued to new owners. Some districts however allow these combinations if they are the owner's initials (for example,  might be able to get XX-NS 1234).

In 2004 in Nuremberg, a car owner was refused a number plate beginning N-PD because of the connection to the political party NPD.
In the 2010s, some districts started banning licence plates with the middle letters IS which resembled the Islamic State. The Herford district registration office ceased issuing registration plates with the combination HF-Z in April 2022 to avoid connotations with the use of the letter "Z" as a symbol for the 2022 Russian invasion of Ukraine.

Other combinations affected are BUL-LE (German derogative for police, roughly comparable to pig), MO-RD (German for murder) and SU-FF (boozing). On the other hand, plates that would seem offensive in other circumstances have been allowed, such as the infamous acronym AC-AB.

Reserved combinations

For quite different reasons, some districts hold certain letter combinations reserved. The Saxon capital Dresden issues all DD-Q plates to the state police vehicles. Likewise, Erfurt uses EF-LP for the police in Thuringia. Munich and other Bavarian cities reserve certain combinations with P for the police units within their authorities, such as M-PM, N-PP or RO-P. Cologne issues K-TX to taxis and K-LN to the city's own vehicles.

Bogus licence plates

Sometimes, e.g. in movie films, it may be necessary to show licence plates which do not really belong to any vehicle. The easiest way would be to create a fictional area code, such as NN-XY 555. In the 1980s the West German TV series   G was used for an imaginary large city in the  area. However, if the plot is supposed to take place in a defined town or region, the audience would expect cars to show codes of that area on their number plates. When James Bond was driving around Hamburg in Tomorrow Never Dies, the obviously fake Berlin licence plates on his BMW were soon pointed out.

In the time before 2000, it had also been possible to use number plates with bogus identifiers containing the letters B, F, G, I, O and Q, which at that time were not issued in the middle group. Meanwhile, however, all these letters can appear on a real licence plate. Yet another way would be to have a valid registration issued (or at least reserved) by the district authority.

Registration

Procedures

Vehicles must be registered with their owner's name and current address. On proof of identity, vehicle documentation and liability insurance, the registration will take place in the district authority competent for the respective address. An alphanumeric combination, which can be reserved according to personal wishes, will be issued to the vehicle. The physical plates, however, have to be acquired separately, either at a local store or online. Both the dimensions of the plates and the typeface of letters and numbers are standardized. After purchasing the number plate, the official stamps must be applied, back at the registration office. A fee is payable for the registration, in addition to the expenses for the plates.

Changes, such as a vehicle being sold or its owner moving residence, must be registered to keep the vehicle documentation up to date. If the vehicle remains within the district, the licence plates may be retained. A vehicle being relocated outside of the district has to be registered at the authority now competent. Whilst it was mandatory to have the plates altered, according to the current address, this obligation was reduced in 2015 and has meanwhile been abolished. Since then, it is generally not possible any more to tell the owner's district of residence from the area code on the plates, as they may have registered it at a former residence e.g. in Hamburg yet moved to Frankfurt meanwhile.

When owners choose to deregister their vehicle, the officer at the local authority will want to see the licence plates with defaced seals on them as proof that the plate can no longer be used in public. For this purpose, special machines are available for use at the registration office. Once defaced, the plates may only be used legally on public roads for one return journey to the owner's residence. If a vehicle is to be deregistered and a new one registered to the same owner, it is possible to swap the licence plate from old to new within the same process. Documentation and fees are necessary nonetheless, and neither vehicle should be used to reach the authority, as the assignment of the number changes by the minute.

It is general practice for owners to deregister their vehicles when selling them, typically when a sale is agreed. A sales contract is highly recommended, and various forms are available online for free. A seller may hand over their vehicle with valid licence plates and papers still in their name to the new owner, and the owner will complete the registration transfer to their name. In a scenario without a proper sales contract, the seller may become liable when the buyer commits traffic violations or even criminal acts related to the car or plates. It is generally not recommended to sell used cars with licence plates.

A car whose owner has not paid their insurance premium and is reported to the police by the insurance company may get , unstamped when found in a public place. The police will remove the official seal using a scratching tool like a screwdriver, leaving the plate without a valid seal. This renders the vehicle illegal to be used, or to be left in a public place, unless the insurance premium is paid and plates are fitted with a new official seal. A one-time journey to the relevant registration authorities is permitted to have the seal reinstated, once insurance is restored.

Costs
As of 2020, the average registration fee is €26.00 whilst further fees may apply for choosing an individual identifier or for reservation of such. Whereas some of these amounts are ordained by federal laws, others vary slightly from one district to the next. The prices for number plates, on the other hand, are subject to the free market and range from less than 10€ up to around 40€ per piece. Generally, it is cheaper to have the plates ordered online, but faster to walk across the street and have them made on the spot.

Further costs arise for motor vehicle tax (€194 on average yet very much depending on engine and emissions) and mandatory liability insurance (€260 on average, in 2019; depending on the model of the vehicle, age and residence of the owner, etc.). Comprehensive insurance is recommended but voluntary.

Special types of registration
Besides the most common way of registering a vehicle for everyday, all-year use indefinitely, it is possible to register for several months of each year, or for a few days in order to export the vehicle abroad. As well it is allowed, under certain restrictions, to register two vehicles (such as a car and a motorhome) under one number, with the same main licence plate. These variations may save expenses in tax and insurance. Further ways of saving apply to vintage cars and to electrically powered vehicles. Each of these special registrations are represented in the respective licence plate.

Special codes, colours and formats
Certain types of vehicle bear special codes.

Different codes
In deviating from the system described above, vehicles registered to federal, state or communal owners can bear licence plates not showing the district and sometimes omitting the middle letters. 

 Highest state offices: The President uses the licence plate 0-1, the Chancellor uses 0-2, the Foreign Minister uses 0-3 and the First State Secretary of the Foreign Office (i.e. the deputy Foreign Minister) uses 0-4. The President of the Parliament uses 1-1. This reflects the fact that the Parliament's President is not part of the executive branch but still ranks higher in (symbolic) importance than the Chancellor. These vehicles are tax-exempt and need not to be insured since the German government acts as insurer.

 The military uses old style non-reflecting plates. The German flag is shown, instead of the blue EU strip. Military plates use the letter Y instead of a city code, as no German city has the initial Y. The Y is followed by a dash and a six-digit number (or five digits for motorcycles), for example Y-123 456. These vehicles are tax-exempt and need not to be insured since the German government acts as insurer. There is also no mandatory technical inspection required but the Armed Forces carry out a regular internal inspection on these vehicles similar to the official inspection.
 Military vehicles which are used by the Nato headquarters in Germany use the same design as the Y-plates except they carry the letter X followed by a four-digit number, for example X-1234.

 Both the federal government and federal state governments use special abbreviations instead of a city code. The code BD  applies to the federal government, ministries, parliament, presidential office, etc., whereas the state governments and diets use their respective codes. This difference is not made in the  Berlin, Hamburg and Bremen, as they fulfil both district and state function in addition to their municipality's.

 Some branches and institutions of the federal government use the abbreviations of their names instead of a city code.
 The  (German Federal Agency for Technical Relief) uses its abbreviation THW, so the plates read THW-80000, for example. All numbers on THW plates start either with the digit 8 or 9.
 The  (Federal Administration of Waterways and Navigation) uses BW followed by a digit identifying the region of the office (from 1=north to 7=south).
DB-12345, BP-12345).
 The federal police uses the code BP for  instead of a local code. Before 2006 the code BG, for their former name , was used in the scheme BG-12345. This old code still remains valid, but any new vehicles will get the new code BP.

 Until the legal reforms of 2006, official cars such as police, fire fighting and municipality vehicles did not carry a letter after the sticker, such as M-1234. These included:
 vehicles of the district government: 1-199, 1000-1999, 10000-19999
 vehicles of the local government (for example: fire brigade): 200-299, 2000-2999, 20000-29999, 300-399
 police:  3000-3999, 7000-7999, 30000-39999, 70000-79999
 disaster relief (mostly changed to "THW", see above): 8000-8999, 80000-89999
This style of plate is no longer issued in most states, but many official vehicles which were registered before 2006 still carry this type of plate.
A similar style of issue is used by some districts to consular or diplomatic vehicles in the form Aaa-9NNn (example: D-921). Unlike the other style of diplomatic/consular plates issued in Berlin and Bonn, this plate does not indicate the nationality of the mission.
 Diplomatic plates: plates of cars covered by diplomatic immunity bear the digit 0 (Zero), followed by a two- or three-digit number which indicates the specific diplomatic mission, a hyphen and another number counting within this mission. Lower-ranking embassy or consular staff without full diplomatic status are issued plates with the regular city code (mostly B for the capital, Berlin, or BN for the former capital, Bonn). The following characters are identical to the 0-plates, e.g. B-19 256; however these are commonly mistaken for non-diplomatic plates. Further holders of diplomatic plates are certain international organizations, such as the UNHCR or the European Central Bank.

Different colours
Very rarely, German licence plates bear characters in different colours than black. These exceptions are:

 Vehicles which are exempt from vehicle taxes (for example ambulances, tractors, agricultural trailers, trailers for boats or trailers for gliders) have green print on a white background plate. Regular trailers for lorries can be exempted from tax if the owner agrees to pay an increased tax on the vehicle which tows the trailer.

 Car dealers′ plates are in red print on a white background, and the code begins with 06. Red plates may be attached to cars which are changing hands, such as the test run of unregistered cars, and the liability insurance is connected to the plate, not a specific car.

 Vehicle collectors: Red plates starting with the number 07 are reserved for collectors of vintage vehicles. Originally, vintage vehicles had a required minimum age of 20 years from first registering. Since April 2007, the required minimum age has been 30 years. Plates issued under the old 20 years rule remained valid after this date. The collectors must get an official certificate of approval (such as no criminal records). They are allowed to use one set of plates on any of their vehicles under the condition that they keep a strict record of use. No day-to-day use of the vehicles is allowed. A valid official technical inspection is not mandatory but the vehicles have to be technically fit for use on public roads.

Different formats and styles
 
 Classic vehicles (known in German by the pseudo-English expression ) can get an H (historic) at the end of the plate, such as K-AA 100H in order to preserve the so-called "vehicle of cultural value". This also implies a flat tax of around €190 per year. It is popular to choose the digits so that they indicate the car's year of manufacture. The requirements for a vehicle to receive an H-Plate are:
The first documented registration was at least 30 years ago.
The car must be in mostly original and preservation worthy condition. Preservation worthy means a grade C by popular car grading standards. The older the car, the more signs of usage it can show. This purely concerns the car's appearance; the road worthiness is established by separate mandatory safety inspections.
 
Plug-in electric vehicles. The 2015 Electric Mobility Act authorised issuing special licence plates for plug-in electric vehicles to allow proper identification to avoid abuses of these privileges. The special licence plate adds the letter E at the end of the licence number. Owners of all-electric cars and plug-in hybrids with a minimum all-electric range of  can apply for the special licence.

 Seasonal number plates are popular for motorbikes or convertibles in the summertime, or for “winter cars” substituting them, yet these plates are available for any vehicle. They bear two 2-digit numbers at the end of the plate indicating the months between which they are registered to drive, with the licence being valid from the start of the upper month until the end of the lower month. This results in lower car taxes, as well as lower insurance premiums.

 Interchangeable plates: Two vehicles of the same class (two cars, two motorbikes or light vehicles, two trailers) may be registered with an alternating licence plate. In this case, only the last digit varies – e.g. B-KJ 414|5 and B-KJ 414|6 – and is printed on an extra plate which remains on either vehicle, whereas the main part of the plate has to be attached to the vehicle in use. Both vehicles have to pay full tax, yet the insurance premium may be discounted.

 Temporary registrations: Used vehicles which are not currently registered to any person or company - or have been deregistered by their current owner, temporarily or permanently - can be driven on public roads using short-term plates, valid for five days only. These are known as “temporary number plates” or “yellow number plates” (due to the yellow strip). The first letter(s) indicate the issuing authority, as in regular German registrations. The numeric code starts with the numbers 04, e.g. DD-04321, and the plate has a yellow strip on the right showing when they are valid. The date is listed numerically, on three lines, reading day, month, year, with two digits each. The vehicle need not have a valid technical inspection, however it must be technically fit to be operated in public. Typically they are used to drive to/from a technical inspection, or to move storage location of the vehicle. Insurance premiums are quite high, appr. €100 for the above-mentioned 5 days. Most insurance companies credit this premium if the car is registered as a normal car with the same insurance company after these 5 days. These temporary plates are only valid within Germany, and cannot be used to export the vehicle to a foreign country nor for transit. They can only be obtained by a resident of Germany.
Export plates  are used for exporting vehicles abroad. The owner does not have to be a German resident to register the car, but must provide identification such as a passport or ID card. The date on the red strip on the right hand side shows the expiration date of the plate, as it indicates for how long the vehicle insurance and tax are paid. After this date, the vehicle must have left Germany, and is automatically deregistered from the German vehicle registration system. Use of the vehicle within Germany is permitted until the export date.

History

German Empire and Weimar Republic

The first German licence plates that had a lettering plan were issued from 1906 onwards. The various states and realms which made up the German Empire used different prefixes, such as Roman numerals ( representing Prussia,  Bavaria,  Württemberg, etc.) or plain letters ( for Hansestadt Hamburg, e.g.). Larger states added further identifiers for their provinces or regions. Saxony did not use any statewide numeral and only used Roman numerals for its provinces.

Other than this, there were no significant changes after the overthrow of the German monarchy.

Third Reich era

During the Nazi regime (1933–1945), the system of licence plates was basically continued. New combinations were issued for nationwide institutions or organisations, such as DR (Deutsche Reichsbahn) for the railway authority, WH , WL , WM  and WT  for the military, or POL for the police.

While the Nazi state expanded and waged war, their bureaucrats applied their systems, including licence plates, to occupied countries or territories. Thus, plates of similar style were introduced in Austria, on Czech and Polish territory, in Alsace and Lorraine, and beyond.

Postwar Germany
After 1945, however, the victorious allied forces abolished the system of German licence plates and instead assigned new lettering combinations in their respective occupation zones. Although each nation implemented their own ideas initially, a system for all four zones was introduced by 1949. At first, the different zones were distinguishable by the first letter prefix A, B, F or S standing for the American, British, French or Soviet occupation zone, respectively. A second letter below indicated the area or country in question, such as  stood for American zone/Bavaria. This area code was followed by a two-digit number signifying the district and another number counting within that area. Often the numbers would become scarce after some years and another zone prefix without the first letter was introduced additionally.

The city of Berlin had a special status and, consequentially, special plates. Having abolished the old  number plates in 1945, the Soviet occupation forces issued plates with Cyrillic characters at first. Motorcycles were issued БM (=BM, 1945–1946) and ГM (GM, 1945–1947). Cars, lorries and buses received ГФ (=GF, 1945–1946) and БГ (=BG, 1945–1947). These were replaced on the insistence of the western powers, first to KB for Kommandatura Berlin and, in the Eastern part of the city, to GB in 1948.

Vehicles of occupation/NATO forces

The British Army of the Rhine (BAOR), initially occupation forces, later NATO elements, issued servicemen with plates carrying white letters and numerals on a black background for their personal vehicles. These cars stood out in comparison to the black on white German plates, and following the terrorist murder of a British serviceman, identified when returning to his car with BAOR licence plates, servicemen had to opt for their cars to carry either UK plates (generally right-hand drive vehicles) or German plates (generally left-hand drive vehicles). During the time that Belgian forces were stationed in West Germany, white on black plates similar to the BAOR plates were used.

US Forces vehicles

The American Forces have tried to “blend in” their servicepersons′ private vehicles in another way. AD, AF and HK, later also IF and QQ. These codes still stood out, especially as they bore the NATO symbol instead of the EU′s circle of stars and the registration seal candidly read  instead of, e.g. . Since 2006, the vehicles in question bear  with regular German area codes, generally referring to the district of their official stationing.

East Germany, DDR

The German Democratic Republic issued their own style of licence plates since 1953. These initials, however, did not refer to the name of the Bezirk but were distributed almost alphabetically from North to South.

After German reunification in 1990, the DDR plates were soon abolished and the West German system introduced, starting in 1991 and completed in 1993. Even before this transition phase, it could be observed that licence plates in GDR scheme were produced with West German typeface on the respective machinery.

West Germany
In July 1956 the current system was introduced in then West Germany, replacing the post-war system. The occupation zones were no longer referred to, instead the new system based on the districts of Germany. Each of these was assigned an alphabetic code which had its origin in the name of the district, i.e. of the city or of the capital of the rural district. Quite often, a “district-free” city was surrounded by, or adjacent to a rural district of the same name. In this case, they would both share the code as well as the name, yet devise a way how to split the possible alphanumerical combinations.

The number of letters in the area code hints at the size of the district. The basic idea was to even out the number of characters on all licence plates, because the most populous districts would have more cars and, therefore, more digits after the prefix. The largest German cities generally only have one-letter codes (B=Berlin, M=Munich, K=Cologne, F=, S=, H=), while most other districts in Germany have two- or three-letter codes. Therefore, cities or districts with fewer letters are generally assumed to be bigger and more important whereas three-letter codes tend to be regarded as rural and dull. Reflecting that, most districts aimed for a combination with fewer letters for their prefix code.

Likewise,  received its former prefix HL, already used between 1906 and 1937 when its statehood was abolished.

The first drafts, however, had to be altered in a few cases. The district of Wittlich rejected the code WC, understandably, and received WIL instead. The code KZ, initially projected for Konstanz, was withdrawn fast, due to recent history, and replaced by KN. Neither were SA, SS or HJ considered to be issued.

When originally planned, the system included codes for districts in Eastern Germany which were to be reserved until reunification. That included the territory of the GDR as well as the territories annexed to Poland and the Soviet Union after World War II, which West Germany's government still claimed in that era until about 1970. When reunification came in 1990, the reserved codes (e.g. P for Potsdam) were indeed issued to East German districts in January 1991, often as originally planned and as they existed at that time.

First changes
Starting in the early 1970s, West German districts were extensively rearranged. In order to reduce their number and so simplify governance, different steps could be taken:
 city districts “swallowed” neighboring municipalities and thus grew.
 city districts lost their sovereignty and were integrated into the surrounding or neighbouring rural district.
 rural districts merged with one or several others, or were split up between neighbouring districts.
 single municipalities were moved between districts, as was deemed appropriate or practical.
In each of these cases, the new districts had to be endowed with an area code. Again, various solutions were possible:
 the largest or most populous district bestowed its name and code upon the newly created unit.
 one former district gave its name and/or capital while another's area code was used for the new district.
 the new unit was given a new name yet continued to use an existing area code.
 the new unit was given a new name and created a new area code.
In any case, the adamant rule was that one area code per district was valid and would be issued to any vehicle registered henceforth. Existing registrations would remain valid until the vehicle was removed from this district to be either relocated or permanently deregistered. Another rule, however, was abolished. Whereas rural districts had generally been named after their capital town, it was now possible to create new names, applying to geographical or historical features. As well it was possible to combine the names of the districts that had merged, either keeping one of their codes or creating a new one.

Germany reunited

When the GDR ceased to exist and Germany was reunited in its present size on 3 October 1990, new area codes were issued to the East German districts. Yet, a considerable number of codes was altered, either because a code which had been reserved for a district in today's Poland or Russia had become available, or because the projected code had meanwhile been issued to a West German district.

The area code ZK had been reserved, in the 1950s, for the city of  but was rejected as ZK had become the abbreviation of the loathed  of the former Communist party SED.

There were no suitable two-letter codes available since HG, HR, HS and HW were already taken by West German districts.

Beginning in the mid-1990s, however, districts in East Germany were rearranged again, similar to the West two decades before. Thus many of these codes issued before were now outdated, but could still be seen alongside the new code. This rearrangement was continued in a second step after 2000, which created large districts with a remarkable variety of possible area codes registered. Still, only one of these was the current one which would be issued to vehicles registered at the moment.

Liberalized registration rules
After the reorganization of districts, from the 1970s onward, many area codes expired and new ones were created at that time. However, number plates issued before these rearrangements remain valid, providing the vehicle is still in use and has not been reregistered since. So it was still possible, if rare, to see a classic car with registration codes of administrative units that have not existed for over 30 years. 

A study conducted in 2010–12 produced the result that 72% of the German population would welcome the possibility to use again these abolished area codes whereas only 13% opposed the idea. 
What was especially striking was that even young people who had never driven a car with such an “old” prefix favoured the idea of this so-called  (licence plate liberalization).

The police, however, warned against this step, as it had turned out that observant citizens would easily notice a car with a number plate from a distant district, thus assisting the police in solving crimes. Plates from the vicinity, on the other hand, would be easier to remember in full, and this would also help to find offenders. More opposition came from local politicians who maintained they had at last succeeded in unifying their merged districts and healed the wounds of those inhabitants who had to give up “their” prefix. If that prefix was available again, they feared, it might lead to old feuds within districts flaming up anew.

Nonetheless, the Federal Ministry of Transport complied with the majority of citizens. As of December 2020, the liberalization has led to 323 previously abolished codes being reintroduced.

Furthermore, it has become possible to “take one′s number along”, i.e. to keep a licence plate issued at the previous address after moving away from that district. For that reason, the area code and the respective state seal on a licence plate do not necessarily mean that the vehicle's owner really lives there.

Insurance plates

Light motorised vehicles such as mopeds, motorized wheelchairs and other small, low-power vehicles (such as vehicles for the physically handicapped, with a maximum speed of ) are required to have a registration plate of a different kind. This  (“insurance plate”) uses a system of three digits on the top and three letters beneath. Both numbers and letters are chosen randomly so personalising the plates is not possible. Plates are much smaller than the plates for normal cars and are only valid for one year from 1 March until the end of February the following year. Those plates are sold by insurance companies, so the fee includes both the registration and the cost of one year's insurance for the vehicle. There are four colours used: black, blue, green for normal plates, and red for temporary use, such as testing (very rare). The first three colours are changed every year in order to make it easy to see whether the vehicle has the correct plate and insurance.

{| class="wikitable"
|+ Colours of the insurance plates from 1 March onwards of each year
! colspan="2" style="text-align: center;" | Colour
! colspan="15" style="text-align: center;" | Year
|-
| style="background-color: #0a0a0d;" | 
| RAL 9005 (Jet black)
| 1990
| 1993
| 1996
| 1999
| 2002
| 2005
| 2008
| 2011
| 2014
| 2017
| 2020
| 2023
| 2026
| 2029
| 2032
|-
| style="background-color: #3481b8;" | 
| RAL 5012 (Light blue)
| 1991
| 1994
| 1997
| 2000
| 2003
| 2006
| 2009
| 2012
| 2015
| 2018
| 2021
| 2024
| 2027
| 2030
| 2033
|-
| style="background-color: #3E753B;"| 
| RAL 6010 (Grass green)
| 1992
| 1995
| 1998
| 2001
| 2004
| 2007
| 2010
| 2013
| 2016
| 2019
| 2022
| 2025
| 2028
| 2031
| 2034
|}

See also
  List of all registration codes issued under the current registration system
  List of registration codes no longer issued
  List of repealed registration codes
  List of registration codes currently issued

Annotations

Notes

Examples

References

External links 

FZV = Fahrzeug-Zulassungs-Verordnung
The complete list, edited by ADAC
Kraftfahrt-Bundesamt (≈Federal Office of Road Traffic), official website, English page
German Number Plates, Also shows how they are made (saved 2011-12-21)
History of German licence plates
Editable licence plates graphics, back to series from 1956
More information about German car number plates and their history
German City Codes, Complete City Code List
German plates information updated. Types and codes (in Spanish)

Germany
Road transport in Germany
 Registration plates